SH2 domain-containing protein 4A is a protein that in humans is encoded by the SH2D4A gene.

Interactions
SH2D4A has been shown to interact with MAGEA11.

References

Further reading